Ronald Mutsaars (born 19 April 1979 in Schijndel) is a Dutch former cyclist, who competed as a professional from 2002 to 2005 with . He rode in the 2003 and 2004 Vuelta a España, as well as the 2005 Paris–Roubaix. His brother Guido and father Henk were also professional cyclists.

Major results

1998
 2nd PWZ Zuidenveld Tour
1999
 2nd Kattekoers
 10th Hel van het Mergelland
2000
 3rd Paris–Tours Espoirs
 9th Overall GP Tell
2001
 3rd Overall Thüringen Rundfahrt
 7th Overall Le Triptyque des Monts et Châteaux
1st Stage 3
2002
 8th Veenendaal–Veenendaal
2003
 6th Ronde van Drenthe
 10th Trofeo Luis Puig
2004
 2nd Overall Tour du Poitou Charentes
 10th Grand Prix S.A.T.S.
2005
 2nd Trofeo Manacor

References

External links

1979 births
Living people
Dutch male cyclists
People from Schijndel
Cyclists from North Brabant